Wayne County is a county in the U.S. state of Utah. As of the 2010 census, the population was 2,778, making it the fourth-least populous county in Utah. Its county seat is Loa.

History
Due to its remoteness and harsh terrain, settlements did not appear in the future Wayne County until the 1880s. By 1892, there was enough settlement and enough interest in a separate county (due mainly to the difficulty of accessing the Piute County seat), that Utah Territory passed an act (effective date March 10, 1892) to separate the east portion of Piute into a separate county. The county was named for Wayne County, Tennessee, itself named for Anthony Wayne. The county boundaries have remained unchanged since its creation.

Geography
The eastern border of Wayne County is delineated by the meanders of the Green River, which flows southward to discharge into the Colorado River. After the two rivers join, the combined southwestern flow forms the remaining portion of the county's eastern border. The central part of the county is drained by the Fremont River and Muddy Creek. The Fremont begins at Fish Lake in Sevier County and flows into Wayne County near its northwestern corner. It joins the Muddy near Hanksville to form the Dirty Devil River, which flows southeastward out of the county's southern border to discharge into Colorado. Wayne County terrain varies from rough forestland on the west to arid poor soil carved by drainages and rocky outcrops. The terrain slopes to the east and south; its highest area is near its NW corner, at 9,888' (3014m) ASL.

The Green River, passing through the canyons of Canyonlands National Park, forms the eastern boundary. The San Rafael Desert occupies the center of the county. Thousand Lake Mountain and Boulder Mountain flank Rabbit Valley on the western end of the county, where beautiful forests contrast with the deserts to the east. The small population of the county is centered in Rabbit Valley, with one town of 200, Hanksville, located in Graves Valley north of the Henry Mountains. Wayne County is also home to Capitol Reef National Park.

Major highways

Adjacent counties

 Emery County - north
 Grand County - northeast
 San Juan County - east
 Garfield County - south
 Piute County - west
 Sevier County (northwest)

National forests/parks

 Canyonlands National Park
 Capitol Reef National Park
 Dixie National Forest
 Fishlake National Forest
 Glen Canyon National Recreation Area

Lakes

 Abes Knoll Reservoir
 Alkali Lake
 Bald Knoll Reservoir
 Beaver Dam Reservoir
 Beef Hollow Reservoir
 Bicknell Reservoir
 Big Hollow Reservoir
 Black Point Reservoir
 Blackburn Reservoir
 Blind Lake (near Neff Reservoir)
 Blind Lake (near Pear Lake)
 Blue Lake
 Bobs Hole
 Brinkerhoff Pond
 Buffalo Pond
 Bull Roost Reservoir
 Bullberry Lakes
 Cameron Reservoir
 Cedar Peak Lake
 Coleman Reservoir
 Cook Lake
 Cub Lake
 Curler Lake
 Cyclone Co-op Reservoir
 Cyclone Knoll Reservoir
 Dead Horse Lake
 Deadman Hollow Reservoir
 Deep Creek Lake
 Donkey Reservoir
 Dry Lake Reservoir
 East Bicknell Sand Wash Pond
 East Gate Reservoir
 Eightmile Reservoir
 Emily Lake
 Evans Reservoir
 Fish Creek Reservoir
 Flat Top Reservoir
 Flatiron Lakes
 Flossie Lake
 Government Lake
 Grass Lake (near Bobs Hole)
 Grass Lake (near Torgerson Lake)
 Green Lake
 Gripe Reservoir
 Hare Lake
 Heart Lake
 Honeymoon Lake
 Hunt Reservoir
 Jakes Knoll Reservoir
 Jane Lake
 Jay Pond
 Jim Larson Reservoir
 Lava Lake
 Lee Lake
 Left Hand Reservoir
 Lightning Lake
 Long Hollow Reservoir
 Lost Lake
 Lower Balsam Reservoir
 Lower Reservoir
 Meadow Gulch Reservoir
 Middle Balsam Reservoir
 Middle Reservoir
 Mill Meadow Reservoir (part)
 Miller Lake
 Mitts Reservoir
 Moroni Reservoir
 Mud Lake
 Ned Reservoir
 Neff Reservoir
 Ottos Reservoir
 Parker Hollow Reservoir
 Pass Reservoir
 Pear Lake
 Petes Pond
 Pine Creek Reservoir
 Pole Canyon Reservoir
 Raft Lake
 Right Fork Wildcat Reservoir
 Rock Lake
 Rock Point Reservoir
 Round Lake (near Heart Lake)
 Round Lake (near Lower Reservoir)
 Sage Reservoir
 Smooth Knoll Reservoir
 Snow Lake
 Snow Lakes
 Solitaire Lake
 Spray Reservoir
 Square Reservoir
 Tidwell Reservoir
 Torgerson Lake
 Twin Lakes
 Upper Balsam Reservoir
 Vance Reservoir
 West Bicknell Pond
 West Flat Top Reservoir Number 1
 West Flat Top Reservoir Number 2
 White Rock Reservoir
 Wide Hollow Reservoir
 Wildcat Reservoir
 Woodys Reservoir

Demographics

2000 census
As of the 2000 United States Census, there were 2,509 people, 890 households, and 669 families in the county. The population density was 1.02/sqmi (0.39/km2). There were 1,329 housing units at an average density of 0.54/sqmi (0.21/km2). The racial makeup of the county was 97.29% White, 0.16% Black or African American, 0.36% Native American, 0.08% Asian, 0.16% Pacific Islander, 1.24% from other races, and 0.72% from two or more races.  1.99% of the population were Hispanic or Latino of any race.

There were 890 households, out of which 36.20% had children under 18 living with them, 66.50% were married couples living together, 5.30% had a female householder with no husband present, and 24.80% were non-families. 21.50% of all households were made up of individuals, and 9.60% had someone living alone who was 65 years of age or older.  The average household size was 2.81, and the average family size was 3.31.

The county population contained 32.40% under the age of 18, 8.10% from 18 to 24, 22.50% from 25 to 44, 22.60% from 45 to 64, and 14.40% who were 65 years of age or older. The median age was 34 years. For every 100 females, there were 103.50 males. For every 100 females aged 18 and over, there were 103.50 males.

The median income for a household in the county was $32,000, and the median income for a family was $36,940. Males had a median income of $26,645 versus $20,000 for females. The per capita income for the county was $15,392.  About 12.70% of families and 15.40% of the population were below the poverty line, including 22.10% of those under age 18 and 8.20% of those aged 65 or over.

Ancestry/Ethnicity
As of 2017 the largest self-identified ancestry groups/ethnic groups in Wayne County, Utah  were:

Communities

Towns
 Bicknell
 Hanksville
 Loa (county seat)
 Lyman
 Torrey

Census-designated places
 Fremont
 Teasdale

Unincorporated communities
 Caineville
 Fruita
 Grover
 Notom

Former communities
 Aldridge
 Eagle City
 Giles

Politics and Government
Wayne County voters are traditionally Republican. In only one national election since 1948 has the county selected the Democratic Party candidate (as of 2020).

See also
 National Register of Historic Places listings in Wayne County, Utah

References

External links

 

 
1892 establishments in Utah Territory
Populated places established in 1892